Chernyanka is the name of several inhabited localities in Russia.

Urban localities
Chernyanka, Belgorod Oblast, a settlement in Chernyansky District of Belgorod Oblast

Rural localities
Chernyanka, Kursk Oblast, a selo in Yefremovsky Selsoviet of Cheremisinovsky District of Kursk Oblast